Carnebone (meaning Ebwyn's rock-pile) is a small hamlet and farm in the parish of Wendron (where the 2011 census population is included) in Cornwall, England.

History
Carnebone was documented in 1298 as Carnebwen. It has also been spelled "Carnbane" in some sources. Patrick Hanks and Flavia Hodges believe that the name of a prominent Cornish family named "Kneebone" derived from Carnebone and that the name was altered "by folk etymology".

The area has long been associated with tin mining. In the 1600s nearby Seworgan was known to contain a blowing-house as early as 1649. Carnebone & Fatwork United tin mining operated from 1853-6 before it was merged.  Carnebone and nearby Tregonebris were documented selling tin in 1856 for £76. Tin mining continued and the engine house of East Wheal Lovell produced some 2,405 tons between 1859 and 1891. Carnebone Moor is in the vicinity, and the hamlet contains the Carnebone Cottage.

See also

 List of farms in Cornwall

References

Hamlets in Cornwall
Farms in Cornwall